Alessandro Borghi may refer to:

Alessandro Borghi (actor) (born 1986), Italian actor
Alessandro Borghi (bishop) (1559–1613), Italian Roman Catholic bishop